The Windsor Arms is a boutique hotel in Toronto, Ontario, Canada. It is located at 18 St. Thomas St. in the heart of the Yorkville neighbourhood. The hotel includes The Living Room, Court Yard Cafe and a Spa.

This neo-gothic style building was designed by architect Kirk Hyslop of Toronto and built in 1927. It was listed as a historic property by the City of Toronto in 1983 and designated under the Ontario Heritage Act in 1992. Run down by the 1980s, the hotel closed in 1991. After purchasing the property in 1995, developer George Friedmann commissioned architect Sol Wassermuhl of Page + Steele to rebuild the hotel as a skyscraper which included condominium suites while maintaining the St. Thomas Street facade.

The Toronto International Film Festival was founded in the hotel in 1976, and the hotel's involvement in the Festival continues to this day.

The hotel has been known to be frequented by many celebrities such as Katharine Hepburn, Elizabeth Taylor, Woody Allen, Richard Burton, and, more recently, Richard Gere, Britney Spears and Tina Turner. It was featured in the 1973 film, The Paper Chase. It has twice been used by Atom Egoyan in films: Speaking Parts in 1989 and Chloe in 2010.

The Windsor Arms Hotel is also home to a luxury condominium with 25 residences.

References

External links
 Windsor Arms Hotel

Hotels in Toronto
City of Toronto Heritage Properties
Hotel buildings completed in 1927
Gothic Revival architecture in Toronto
Condo hotels in Canada
Residential condominiums in Canada